Kuwait competed at the 1992 Summer Olympics in Barcelona, Spain. 32 competitors, all men, took part in 18 events in seven sports.

Competitors
The following is the list of number of competitors in the Games.

Athletics

Men's 110m Hurdles
 Zeiad Al-Kheder 
 Heats — 14.51 (→ did not advance)

Men's Triple Jump
Marsoq Al-Yoha 
 Qualification — 16.75 m (→ did not advance)

Men's Javelin Throw
Ghanim Mabrouk 
 Qualification — NM (→ did not advance)

Men's Hammer Throw
Waleed Al-Bakheet 
 Qualification — 63.94 m (→ did not advance)

Fencing

One fencer represented Kuwait in 1992.

Men's épée
 Mohamed Al-Hamar

Football

Judo

Shooting

Swimming

Weightlifting

References

External links
 Official Olympic Reports

Nations at the 1992 Summer Olympics
1992
Summer Olympics